Eleginus is a genus of cods. There are two recognized species:
 Eleginus gracilis (Tilesius, 1810) (saffron cod)
 Eleginus nawaga (Walbaum, 1792) (navaga)

References

Gadidae
Marine fish genera
Ray-finned fish genera
Taxa named by Gotthelf Fischer von Waldheim